Neeyallengil Njan is a 1987 Indian Malayalam-language film, directed by Vijayakrishnan and produced by Hassan. The film stars Jagathy Sreekumar, Sindhu, Captain Raju and Balan K. Nair in the lead roles.

Cast
Jagathy Sreekumar as Ramankutty
Sindhu as Thankamma
Captain Raju as Omaka
Balan K. Nair as Divakaran
Bheeman Raghu as Tiger Ramu
Sangita Madhavan Nair as Syamala
T. G. Ravi as Das Mavunkal
Gomathi as Thulasi/Sarojini
Bahadoor as Velayudhan Pilla
Kaduvakulam Antony as Philip
Bobby Kottarakkara as Kuttappan
Ramu as Vinod
Vanchiyoor Radha as Balachandran's mother
Prathapachandran as Shekhar
Disco Shanthi in item number

References

External links
 

1987 films
1980s Malayalam-language films